Li Ruijun (born 1983) is a Chinese film director and screenwriter.

Personal life
Born in Gansu Province in 1983, Li Ruijun studied music and painting at the age of fourteen. In 2003, he graduated from the China National Ministry of Radio, Film and Television. From 2003 to 2006, he worked as director for television stations and television program providers.

He started work on his debut feature film The Summer Solstice (2007) in 2006, writing the script as well as directing it, and finished the post-production in 2007.

Filmography 
The Summer Solstice 夏至 (2007) - director, screenwriter, actor, editor, production manager   
The Old Donkey 老驢頭 (2010) - director, screenwriter, composer, editor   
Fly with the Crane 告訴他們,我乘白鶴去了 (2012) - director, screenwriter
Present 禮物 (short film, 2014) - director, screenwriter
One Day (segment: "Present") 有一天 (segment: "禮物") (2014) - director, screenwriter      
River Road (2015) - director, screenwriter, editor
Walking Past the Future (2017) - director, screenwriter
Return to Dust  (2022) - director, screenwriter and editor.

Awards 
2013 46th Brasilia Film Festival: Best Director (Fly with the Crane) 
2014 5th China Film Directors' Guild: Best Young Director (Fly with the Crane)

References

External links 
 
 

1983 births
Living people
Film directors from Gansu
Screenwriters from Gansu
People from Zhangye